The Ester Republic is a small, independent monthly newspaper published in Ester, Alaska, and established January 1999. The paper serves as an alternative media publication for the Tanana Valley. It is the only newspaper that has been published in Ester; the village has been served historically by Fairbanks newspapers. Contributors are generally amateur writers, although some professional journalists, poets, and photographers appear in its pages (e.g., Richard A. Fineberg, John Haines, Dahr Jamail). The periodical encourages submissions of editorial cartoons by Alaskan artists, and has two "staff" cartoonists, Jamie Smith and Daniel Darrow. The paper has been operated out of the home of the publisher for much of its history; for a time its office space was the historic Ester post office, a 14'x16' structure built in 1971.

The paper was the recipient of at least one award from the Alaska Press Club each year from 2002 to 2008.

External links
 
 The publisher's blog

1999 establishments in Alaska
Independent newspapers published in the United States
Mass media in Fairbanks, Alaska
Monthly newspapers
Newspapers published in Alaska
Publications established in 1999